Makuto is a surname. Notable people with the surname include:

Asha Makuto (born 1986), Kenyan volleyball player
Everlyne Makuto (born 1990), Kenyan volleyball player
Violet Makuto (born 1992), Kenyan volleyball player

Surnames of African origin